The Pupuke River is a river of the Northland Region of New Zealand's North Island.

See also
List of rivers of New Zealand

References

Rivers of the Northland Region
Rivers of New Zealand